Amal Abul-Qassem Donqol (1940 – 21 May 1983) was an Egyptian poet whose poems were influenced by Greek mythology, then pre-Islamic and Islamic imagery to modernize Arabic poetry. He was born in Al Qalah, Qfta, Qena and completed his secondary education there in 1957. He attended the faculty of Arts in 1958 just after his graduation from the secondary education stage. He dropped out to work as an employee at Qena Court of Justice as well as the Customs Department of Suez and Alexandria and the Afro-Asian People's Solidarity Organisation for a living before the end of his first year in the faculty.
He died in 1983 after long-time illness.

Early life and education
Amal was born in Al Qalah village, Qfta, an administrative division of Qena in Upper Egypt on 23 June 1940. Amal was given his name, which means "hope" in Arabic and is commonly given to girls, because he was born in the very same year his father got his habilitation degree from al-Azhar University.
Donqol's father, an al-Azhar graduate, who wrote classic poetry, possessed a library full of books in the various Islamic literary modes of which his son took advantage. He died when Donqol was ten years old and at such an early age, Donqol had to support his mother and two younger brothers.
He completed his secondary education in Qena in 1957. In 1958, he enrolled in the Faculty of Arts, Cairo University. Before the end of his first year, he dropped out to work for a living as an employee at the Qena Court of Justice, the Customs Departments in Suez and Alexandria and the Afro-Asian People's Solidarity Organisation. But he was always drawn to poetry.

Personal life
He was married to an Egyptian journalist Abla Elrowainy.

"The Prince of Refusers"

Amal Dunqol was known as the "Prince of Refusers" for his famous poem, "Do not reconcile" , it was originally composed and became a cry across the Arab world as a call to Egyptian President Sadat to not sign the Camp David peace treaty with Israel in 1976. More recently, as Arab regimes have cracked down on popular uprisings, people have come to relate to the piece in a different light, viewing it as a call to neither reconcile nor negotiate with their own tyrannical regimes.

Published works
Crying in front of zarqaa el yamama (1969)
Comments on what has happened (1971)
Murdering of the moon (1974)
The coming Testament (1975)
New documents about basous war (1983)
Papers of room number 8 (1983)

Death
Amal died on 21 May 1983 after 3 years of suffering from cancer.

References

External links 
Amal Abul-Qassem Donqol at Egyptian State Information Service.
 Amal's masterpiece "Don't reconcile" translated into English as part of the Political Arabic Poetry translation project.

Egyptian male poets
1940 births
1983 deaths
20th-century Egyptian poets
20th-century male writers
Deaths from cancer in Egypt
People from Qena Governorate